The Silent Master is a 1917 American drama film directed by Léonce Perret and starring Robert Warwick. The film is an adaption of The Court of St. Simon by E. Phillips Oppenheim.

Plot
A young Parisian dancer witnesses the ruin of a man's life due to betrayal.

Cast
Robert Warwick as Valentin, Marquis de Sombreuil, or Monsieur Simon
Olive Tell as Virginia Arlen
Donald Gallaher as Eugene de Presles
Anna Little as Jacqueline
Juliette Moore as Juliette
Henri Valbel as Robert
Valentine Petit as Mrs. Carlingford
George Clarke as Mr. Carlingford
Juliette Moore as Juliette

Reception
A critic for Moving Picture World wrote, "The production is well made and is of a distinctively melodramatic type."

References

External links

1917 films
American black-and-white films
Silent American drama films
1917 drama films
American silent feature films
Selznick Pictures films
Films directed by Léonce Perret
1910s American films